Homothetic may refer to:

Geometry 
 Homothetic transformation, also known as homothety, homothecy, or homogeneous dilation
 Homothetic center
 Homothetic vector field

Economics 
 Homothetic preferences